Transmembrane protein 72 is a protein that in humans is encoded by the TMEM72 gene.

References

Further reading